Alin Florentin Pencea (born 8 June 1992) is a Romanian professional footballer who plays as a midfielder for CSM Deva.

Honours
Turris Turnu Măgurele
Liga III: 2018–19

References

External links
 
 

1992 births
Living people
People from Alexandria, Romania
Romanian footballers
Association football midfielders
Liga I players
Liga II players
Liga III players
CS Concordia Chiajna players
AFC Chindia Târgoviște players
AFC Turris-Oltul Turnu Măgurele players
CSM Deva players